Last Scene (stylized in all caps) is the eighth studio album by Japanese singer and songwriter Rina Aiuchi, released on July 28, 2010 by Giza Studio. The album has yielded four singles, including a Japan top thirty hit single, "Hanabi". After the album release, she went into hiatus due to health issues.

The album reached number 8 on the Oricon weekly albums charts in its first week and charted for six weeks.

Promotion

Singles
As a first part of the weekly project of releasing a song every week on the three consecutive weeks, "Good Days" was released as the lead single from the album on 14 April 2010. The released was followed by two other singles: "Sing a Song" and "C Love R".

"Hanabi" was released on 28 July 2010 as the fourth single of the album. The song served as the theme song to the Japanese television show Happy Music. The song reached number twenty-eight on the Oricon singles chart, selling approximately 6,152 copies nationwide. The single was a commercial failure, becoming Aiuchi's lowest-charting and least-selling single as of September 2018.

Track listing

Charts

Certification and sales

|-
! scope="row"| Japan (RIAJ)
| 
| 20,672
|-
|}

Release history

References

2010 albums
Being Inc. albums
Japanese-language albums
Giza Studio albums